Minnale is a 2001 Indian Tamil-language romance film directed by Gautham Vasudev Menon. The story was written by Menon and Vipul D. Shah, starring Madhavan, Abbas, Reema Sen (in her Tamil debut), Vivek and Nagesh. The film tells the story of a love-struck man, stealing the identity of his former college foe, to pursue his lady love, and the eventual repercussions he has to face when his cover is blown before he could come clean. The film's original soundtrack composed by debutant music composer Harris Jayaraj, became popular prior to the film's release. The cinematography of the film was handled by R. D. Rajasekhar and it was edited by Suresh Urs.

Minnale released on 2 February 2001 to positive reviews and became a commercial success. Menon remade the film the same year in Hindi as Rehnaa Hai Terre Dil Mein, with Madhavan reprising his role. The film was also remade in Kannada as Mr. Duplicate (2011).

Plot 
Rajesh Shivakumar and Sam are students at an engineering college in Ooty. Sam is a top-performing student who is popular with the students and faculty, while Rajesh, an underperforming student, is notorious for his rebellious, violent and misogynistic attitude. This contrast in personalities puts the two students at loggerheads throughout their college days, with both of them engaging in constant fights and pranks with each other. Upon graduating, Sam and Rajesh decide to never see each other ever again. Sam goes to the United States as he has secured a job while Rajesh decides to stay in India.

Two years later, Rajesh is a software engineering instructor in Chennai and roams around in his free time with his close friend Chockalingam "Chokku". He stays with his grandfather Subbuni, a librarian from the Aminjikarai neighbourhood of Chennai. Rajesh's affection for his grandfather is such that he even refuses to accept an on-site opportunity in Singapore so that he can be with him. While on a trip to Bangalore, he comes across a young woman dancing with children in the rain and gets immediately smitten by her when he sees her face lit by the flash of a lightning bolt. He comes across this woman again during a friend's wedding and soon learns that the woman's name is Reena Joseph and she works as a chartered accountant at Ford, Bangalore. Some days later, Rajesh, who is back in Chennai, notices Reena again, this time exiting a Ford office cab. He and Chokku pursue Reena, but lose track of her in a mall.

Rajesh and Chokku meet Reena's best friend Vasuki at a market, and enquire about Reena. Vasuki informs them that Reena has been transferred to Chennai, however, when she realises that Rajesh is in love with Reena, she angrily mentions that Reena has already been engaged to an Indian American software engineer from Seattle named Rajiv Samuel, who happens to be her childhood friend, hence it would be futile to pursue her. Rajesh is upset at this development; however, on learning that Reena has never seen Rajiv since her childhood, and on the goading and encouragement of Subbuni and Chokku, decides to pursue Reena. He comes to her house impersonating Rajiv. Reena is smitten by Rajesh and within a few days, she reciprocates Rajesh's love. Rajesh decides to reveal his true identity to her, but before he can, the real Rajiv arrives in Chennai. When Reena realises that the "Rajiv" she loves is an impostor, she breaks up with him and warns him never to come near her again.

Rajesh, Chokku and their friends decide to meet Rajiv to somehow convince him to break his engagement with Reena. To Rajesh's shock, he finds out that Rajiv is his old nemesis Sam. Enraged that Rajesh cheated Reena, Sam refuses to break up their engagement. Rajesh also tries to seek Reena's forgiveness, to no avail, and stalks her while she is on a date with Sam at a restaurant. Sam notices this and both he and Rajesh engage in a brawl which is stopped by Reena, who again warns Rajesh never to come near her. Rajiv also threatens to kill Rajesh if he sees him at the same place as Reena ever again. Enraged, Rajesh, Chokku and their friends decide to beat up Sam in a parking lot, but Rajesh backs out at the last minute, accepting the bitter truth that Sam and Reena are going to get married as well as realising what he did all this while was wrong.

Rajesh decides to accept the on-site opportunity in Singapore which he had earlier rejected, to forget Reena. Meanwhile, Reena realises that she has fallen in love with Rajesh, despite having been cheated by him. On the wedding day, Sam realises the love Reena has for Rajesh. He immediately cancels the wedding and takes Reena to the airport, where Rajesh is about to board a flight to Singapore. Sam tells with a very heavy heart to Rajesh that although they will always be enemies, he cannot marry a girl who does not love him. He tells him to take good care of Reena and he leaves by telling that they both should never ever meet again in life. Rajesh and Reena are happily united.

Cast 

 Madhavan as Rajesh Shivakumar (Porki/Rajiv (Fake))
 Abbas as Rajiv Samuel (Sam)
 Reema Sen as Reena Joseph
 Nagesh as Subramanyam "Subbuni"
 Vivek as Chockalingam 'Chokku'
 Kitty as Joseph, Reena's father
 Fathima Babu as Shanthi, Reena's mother
 Rajiv Choudhry as Rajiv's father
 Janaki Sabesh as Rajiv's mother
 A. C. Murali Mohan
 Raji Iyer as Vasuki, Reena's friend
 Pondy Ravi as Ravi, Reena's neighbour in Chennai
 Manish Borundia as Manish, Rajesh's classmate
 Krishna as the lorry driver
 Vidharth as Rajesh's classmate (uncredited)
 Gautham Vasudev Menon as the flower deliveryman to Reena (uncredited)
 R. D. Rajasekhar as the flower deliveryman to Reena (uncredited)
 Nagendra Prasad as a dancer in Azhagiya Theeye song (uncredited)
 Shobi as a dancer in Azhagiya Theeye song (uncredited)
 Sridhar as a dancer in Azhagiya Theeye song (uncredited)

Production 
Gautham Vasudev Menon launched a Tamil romantic film titled, O Lala in 2000 with the project eventually changing producers and title into Minnale with Madhavan, who was at the beginning of his career, being signed on to portray the lead role. About the making of the film, Menon revealed that he found it difficult as the team was new to the industry with only the editor of the film, Suresh Urs, being a prominent technician in the industry.  Menon had come under further pressure when Madhavan had insisted that Menon narrated the story to his mentor, Mani Ratnam, to identify if the film was a positive career move after the success of his Alai Payuthey. Despite initial reservations, Menon did so and Ratnam was unimpressed; however Menon has cited that he thought that Madhavan "felt sorry" and later agreed to continue with the project.

Miss World 1999, Yukta Mookhey was considered to play the film's heroine during July 2000, as was Isha Koppikar, but eventually they were left out and Reema Sen, who appeared in her first Tamil film, was cast. Minnale also saw Madhavan collaborating with Abbas for second time after Kannada film Shanti Shanti Shanti. Post-release, Abbas felt that his scenes had been cut from the film and accused Madhavan of playing a role in editing his sequences out from the film.

Music 

The music and background  score of the movie were composed by Harris Jayaraj. The audio cassette of the film was released in Chennai at a function in January 2001, where the songs were also screened. Upon release, the soundtrack received critical acclaim and was a major contributor to the film's commercial success. Harris Jayaraj won his first Filmfare Best Music Director award in Tamil breaking A. R. Rahman's successive win for 9 years. The song "Vaseegara" is set in Natabhairavi raga marked the debut of poet Thamarai as a film song lyricist.

All songs except Ivan Yaaro and Iru Vizhi Unadhu (Ore Nyabagam) were reused in the film's Hindi version Rehnaa Hai Terre Dil Mein by Harris himself.

Release and reception 
The film was advertised as a Valentine's Day release in 2001 in Tamil Nadu, but was released on 2 February 2001, and upon release it went on to become a large success commercially. Madhavan became extremely popular among the youth after the release of Alai Payuthey, but had a setback as his next film underperformed. Minnale made him once again popular among the youth. Savitha Padmanabhan of The Hindu claimed that the film had a "lot of verve and vigour" and that it was "sure to go down well" with the "yuppie, college-going youngsters". A reviewer, Shilpa Kannan from Zee Next, also gave the film a positive review, writing "the entire movie is given an advertisement like treatment by the director. It is glossy, stylish, youthful and trendy". Visual Dasan of Kalki rated the film "above average".

Other versions 
Minnale was dubbed into Telugu under the name Cheli and also performed well at the box office, owing to Madhavan's popularity in Andhra Pradesh. The success of Minnale led to producer Vashu Bhagnani signing Menon on to direct the Hindi language remake of the film, Rehnaa Hai Terre Dil Mein, which featured Madhavan reprising his role. The Hindi version gained mixed reviews and subsequently went on to become an above average grosser at the box office. However, the film belatedly gained popularity through screenings on television and subsequently developed a cult following amongst young audiences and the actors released a video thanking the film's admirers for their adulation on the fifteenth anniversary of the film's release.

References

External links 
 
 

2000s romance films
2000s Tamil-language films
2001 directorial debut films
2001 films
Films about fraud
Films about stalking
Films directed by Gautham Vasudev Menon
Films scored by Harris Jayaraj
Films shot in Ooty
Indian romance films
Tamil films remade in other languages